Stig Joar Haugen (born August 2, 1990, in Hamar, Norway), known professionally as Unge Ferrari and Stig Brenner, is a Norwegian rapper, singer, and songwriter. Haugen debuted in 2015 with the EP Til mine venner. It featured the breakthrough singles "Lianer" and "Hvis du vil" with Tomine Harket, and was nominated for Spellemannprisen in the "Urban" category as well as for P3 Gull 2015 in the Newcomer of the Year category.

In 2018 he released the album Midt imellom magisk og manisk, which debuted with atop the Norwegian VG-lista albums chart. For the album, he was nominated for two awards ahead of Spellemannprisen 2018: Songwriter of the Year and Album of the Year. He was also nominated for P3 Gull 2018 in the Live Artist of the Year category.

Discography

Studio album

EPs

Singles 
 "Wollahp" (2015)
 "Bulmers" (2015)
 "Vanilje" (2015)
 "Hvis Du Vil" (with Tomine Harket) (2015)
 "Scubadive" (2016)
 "BBB" (with Arif) (2017)
 "Du Bestemmer" (with Arif) (2017)
 "Hologram" (2017)
 "Urettferdig" (2017)
 "D&G" (2017)
 "Ashanti"(2017)
 "Sorry Mamma" (with Arif) (2018)
 "Tunaraha" (with Arif) (2018)
 "Ung & Dum" (2018)
 "Balkong" (2018)
 "Bagasje" (with Ylva Olaisen) (2018)
 "Privat" (2019)
 "3 Shots" (2019)
 "Siste Sjans" (with Newkid) (2019)

References

External links 

 Unge Ferrari's Facebook

21st-century Norwegian singers
Norwegian-language singers
Musicians from Hamar
1990 births
Living people